The Italian ambassador to China is the head of the Italian diplomatic mission in China, the official representative of the Government in Rome to the Government of China.

List of representatives

References 

 
China
Italy